WMNR (88.1 FM, "Fine Arts Radio") is a radio station licensed to Monroe, Connecticut. The station is municipally owned by the Town of Monroe and broadcasts mainly  classical music.

History 
The station was founded in 1971 by John and Carol Babina. The Monroe Board of Education agreed to hold the FCC license for WMNR and provided facilities for the station at Masuk High School. The equipment was paid for with donations from individual and businesses, and the station turned into a community project. The station began broadcasting regularly in 1974 with a variety of programming, including rock, big band, and classical.

In 1980, it was thought that WMNR could fulfill a need for public radio in Fairfield county. A non-profit organization, Monroe Public Radio, Inc., began operating the station at this time. In early 1982, it became an NPR affiliate, and was able to secure a one-time federal grant for new equipment to increase power. However, before any of this could be done, Monroe Public Radio, Inc. ran out of funds and the station's operation returned to the founders, John and Carol Babina. In mid-1982, WMNR began broadcasting classical music and was run by a staff of volunteers.

As the years progressed, three other stations in Connecticut were added to simulcast WMNR.  WRXC (90.1 FM) in Shelton was assigned its call letters on March 20, 1986 and began broadcasting in 1988. The following year, WGSK (90.1 FM) in South Kent received its call sign on December 14, 1987, licensed to South Kent School and was transferred to Monroe on November 13, 1990.  WGRS (91.5 FM) in Guilford was assigned its call sign on May 31, 1993 and began broadcasting that same year.

By 2003, they had outgrown their allotted space at the high school and moved into rented office space. In 2009, the licenses for WMNR were transferred from the Monroe Board of Education to the Town of Monroe.

Other stations

Repeaters

Translators 
Several translators are authorized to rebroadcast these stations, including five in the state of New York.

Notes:

References

External links

Guilford, Connecticut
Monroe, Connecticut
MNR
Classical music radio stations in the United States
Radio stations established in 1973
1973 establishments in Connecticut